Anuradha (born 4 March 1971), known by her stage name Tara, is an Indian actress, known for her work in Kannada cinema and politics. She joined the Bharatiya Janata Party (BJP) in 2009 and is currently a nominated member of the Karnataka Legislative Council.

Tara made her debut in film in 1984 with the Tamil film Ingeyum Oru Gangai. Her Kannada film debut came in 1986 with Thulasidala and has since portrayed many author-backed roles. Her notable performances came in films such as Krama (1991), Munjaneya Manju (1993), Kanooru Heggadithi (1999), Munnudi (2000), Mathadana (2001), Hasina (2005), Cyanide (2006) and Ee Bandhana (2007). Her performance in Hasina won her the National Film Award for Best Actress.

After joining BJP, she was elected as the president of the Karnataka Chalanachitra Academy in 2012 and held the position for a year. In the same year, she was nominated as a member of the Karnataka Legislative Council, the upper house of the legislature of Karnataka.

Career

Tara made her first appearance on screen for a Tamil film Ingeyum Oru Gangai directed by noted actor, Manivannan, in 1984 which also featured Murali in the lead. Followed by this, she featured in her first Kannada film Thulasidala in 1985. However, she got the big break of her career through a Rajkumar starrer Guri in 1986 and thereafter she has acted in several movies as a leading lady and mainly as supporting actress. Her performance in Girish Karnad's Kanooru Heggadithi brought her widespread recognition. She received her first ever award as best actress for the Kannada movie Krama(1991), directed by debutant director Asrar Abid. In the late 1980s, she appeared in Mani Ratnam's blockbuster Tamil films, Nayakan and Agni Natchathiram, as a supporting actress.

Tara worked with almost all of the leading male co-stars in the 1980s and 1990s including Rajkumar, Shankar Nag, Vishnuvardhan, Ambareesh, Ananth Nag, Ravichandran, Shashikumar, Tiger Prabhakar, Shivarajkumar, Raghavendra Rajkumar, Murali, Karthik, Sunil and Devaraj. She received her second "best actress" state award for the movie Kanooru Heggadithi and "best supporting actress" award for the movie Munjaneya Manju. She also received critical acclaim for the female centric film Munnudi, which received multiple National Film Awards, including the Best Film on Other Social Issues.

In 2005, she was cast by Girish Kasaravalli in his film Hasina, for which she won a National Award from the Indian Government. Subsequently, her role in the Kannada movie Deadly Soma was appreciated. Then came another breakthrough performance in the movie Cyanide. In 2007, Tara received her third Best Actress award. Beside acting, she produced Hasina, directed by Girish Kasaravalli, and she has also announced an intention to direct films as well.

Personal life
Tara married the cinematographer H. C. Venugopal in 2005. They have a son (b. 2013).

Filmography

Television

Notes

References

External links
 
 

1973 births
Living people
Best Actress National Film Award winners
Actresses in Kannada cinema
Indian film actresses
Actresses in Tamil cinema
Actresses from Bangalore
Filmfare Awards South winners
Bharatiya Janata Party politicians from Karnataka
21st-century Indian women politicians
21st-century Indian politicians
Actresses in Telugu cinema
20th-century Indian actresses
21st-century Indian actresses
Recipients of the Rajyotsava Award 2003
Actresses in Malayalam television
Women members of the Karnataka Legislative Assembly